Apeldoorn Osseveld is a railway station located in Apeldoorn, Netherlands. The station was opened on 10 December 2006 and is located on the Apeldoorn–Deventer railway. The services is operated by Nederlandse Spoorwegen.

Facilities

The station has two platforms, a car park, cycle parking and a nearby bus stop where line 5 stops. The stop is called Talma Borgh and is approximately 400 metres south of the station along the Ravelijn.

Train services
, the following train services call at this station:
Local Sprinter service: Apeldoorn - Deventer - Almelo (- Hengelo - Enschede)
This service continues towards Enschede during weekday peak hours only.

References

External links
NS website 
Dutch Public Transport journey planner 
Syntus Gelderland website 
station Apeldoorn Osseveld at stationsweb.nl 

Osseveld
Railway stations opened in 2006
Railway stations on the Apeldoorn - Deventer railway line
2006 establishments in the Netherlands
Railway stations in the Netherlands opened in the 21st century